was the thirty-ninth of the sixty-nine stations of the Nakasendō, as well as the seventh of eleven stations on the Kisoji. It is located in the present-day village of Ōkuwa, in the Kiso District of Nagano Prefecture, Japan.

History
Of all of the post towns along the Kisoji, Suhara was the first one to be established, though originally at a different location. After the town was washed away by a major flood in 1717, it was moved to its present location.

Neighboring post towns
Nakasendō & Kisoji
Agematsu-juku - Suhara-juku - Nojiri-juku

References

Stations of the Nakasendō
Stations of the Nakasendo in Nagano Prefecture